The Clypse Course describes a motor-cycle racing course used for the Isle of Man TT Races between 1954 and 1959.  

The course uses two short sections of the Snaefell Mountain Course which includes the primary A18 road between Cronk-ny-Mona and Creg-ny-Baa used in the reverse direction. Also, the primary A18 Mountain Road between Signpost Corner and Governor's Bridge. The name Clypse is probably a contraction from the Scandinavian word Kleppsstar ( Kleppr's farm) which gives the modern name of Clypse Beg and Clypse Mooar.

History
The Clypse Course was a new street circuit for racing in the Isle of Man was used to re-introduce the Ultra-Lightweight TT and Sidecar TT Race for the 1954 Isle of Man TT Races. To facilitate racing on the Clypse Course, during the winter of 1953/54 road widening occurs on the Mountain Course at Creg-na-Baa, Signpost Corner and the approach to Governor's Bridge. The re-introduction of the Sidecar TT Race for the 1954 Isle of Man TT Race was controversial as it was opposed by the motor-cycle manufacturers and also for the inclusion of the first female competitor Inge Stoll at an Isle of Man TT race. 

The Lightweight TT Race was run on the Clypse Course for the first time in 1955 and continued until the 1959 race. The Clubman Races were run on the Clypse Course for 1955, then reverting to the Snaefell Mountain Course for the next year. The last year for racing on the Clypse Course was the 1959 Isle of Man TT Race. 

For 1960, the Lightweight, Ultra-Lightweight and Sidecar TT Races reverted to the Mountain Course.

Speed and lap records
The lap record for the Clypse Course is 8 Minutes and 4.2 seconds at an average speed of  set by Tarquinio Provini during the 1959 Lightweight TT Race.

Legacy
The Clypse Course has not been used since 1959. Parts of the Clypse Course that are not part of the Snaefell Mountain Course have been used for cycle racing, Hill Climb events and Classic Car Racing. Parts of the Clypse Course which include the secondary road B12 Creg-na-Baa 'Back-Road' and the B20 Begoade Road are regularly used for the Rally Isle of Man and the Manx Rally.

Winners at the Clypse Course

Winners (riders)

Winners (manufacturers)

By year

Sources

External links
 Circuit Guide and Results 

Grand Prix motorcycle circuits
Motorsport venues in the Isle of Man